Dinsoor is a town in the southwestern Bay region of Somalia. It is the center of the Dinsoor District.

Demographics
Dinsoor has a population of around 28,000 inhabitants. The broader Dinsoor District has a total population of 75,769 residents.

Notable residents
Hasan Adan Samatar

Notes

References

Diinsoor
Dinsoor, Somalia - coordinates

Populated places in Bay, Somalia